FK Karpaty Limbach is a Slovak football team based in the town of Limbach. The club was founded in 1950.

References

External links
Official website 

Karpaty Limbach